Khalifeh Qeshlaq (also Romanized as Khalīfeh Qeshlāq, and Khalīfeh-ye Qeshlāq; also known as Khalfak Qishlāq and Khalifeh Gheshlagh) is a village in Shivanat Rural District, Afshar District, Khodabandeh County, Zanjan Province, Iran. At the 2006 census, its population was 334, in 67 families.

References 

Populated places in Khodabandeh County